The Longhorn Radio Network is a radio network in the United States that is dedicated to broadcasting live events and programming of the Texas Longhorns football, basketball (men's and women's), baseball, and softball teams.  Owned by Learfield IMG College and the University of Texas at Austin via a joint venture, the network consists of 36 affiliates covering 90% of the state of Texas. The network provides broadcasts in the English language for most affiliates, with some affiliates providing broadcasts in Spanish for the benefit of Hispanic listeners.

Programming 
The network produces and broadcasts an annual total of 123 live broadcasts of sporting events, plus 28 weekly editions of the coach's shows starring the football (September–November) and men's basketball coaches (November–March), as well as all postseason events involving the Longhorns.  
Longhorn Weekly - a one-hour sports show featuring the head coaches of the university's major sports programs.

On-air personalities
Craig Way - play-by-play
Roger Wallace - color (football)
Quan Cosby - sideline analyst (football)
Eddie Oran - analyst (men's basketball)

Affiliates 
The main flagships of the network are KTXX in Austin, Texas for the English broadcasts, and KZNX for the Spanish broadcasts of football games.

References

External links
Texas Longhorns official website 
Audio Streaming 
Austin Radio Network - flagships of the Longhorn Radio Network

College basketball on the radio in the United States
College football on the radio
Radio stations in Texas
Sports radio networks in the United States
Texas Longhorns
University of Texas at Austin